St. Ignatius College is a Brazilian Catholic school located in Fortaleza, Ceará. It offers kindergarten through high school as well as an evening school which enables workers to complete elementary and high school. The school was founded by the Society of Jesus in 1955.

History
St. Ignatius College began in 1955 as a small school at the Church of Christ the King, under the name of Apostolic Pre-School Our Lady of Fatima. The following year it took the name Christ the King Day School but had semi-boarding. A new foundation was laid in 1960 and the school moved to its current headquarters under the name St. Ignatius College in 1963.

Its directors have all been Jesuit priests:
 
 Gerardo Sá da Silveira – 1963–1967
 José Correia – 1967–1972
 Pedro Alberto Campos – 1972–1977
 Antonio Farias Basic – 1977–1979
 Luciano – 1980–1986
 Pedro Vicente Ferreira – 1986–1988
 Manuel Madruga – 1988–1991
 Benjamin Gesteira – 1992–1995
 Pedro Vicente Ferreira – 1996–2001
 José Ivan Dias – 2002–2005
 Antonio Tabosa – 2005–2008 
 Raimundo Kroth – 2008–2010
 Ponciano Petri – 2010–2011

See also
 List of Jesuit educational institutions

References  

1955 establishments in Brazil
Buildings and structures in Fortaleza
Educational institutions established in 1955
Education in Ceará
Jesuit schools in Brazil
Mixed-sex education
Catholic primary schools in Brazil
Catholic secondary schools in Brazil
Private schools in Brazil